Sons of Northern Darkness is the seventh album by Norwegian black metal band Immortal. Musically, it continues the blackened thrash metal style heard on the two previous releases At the Heart of Winter and Damned in Black. This was the band's first release on Nuclear Blast Records and the last album to feature Iscariah on bass, who admitted to only play bass on the opening track "One by One", with the rest of the album's bass tracks being played by vocalist/guitarist Abbath, which is the last time he would contribute to playing bass before his departure in 2015.

The album was released in multiple formats, including a standard CD, a limited edition four-panel digipak, a limited edition metal box, a "Deluxe Edition" digipak with bonus DVD, a picture disc, a gatefold double LP, and a quadruple 10" leather box. The limited edition metal box was only available via Nuclear Blast mailorder and was sold out before it was actually released.

The song "In My Kingdom Cold" references the H.P. Lovecraft story At the Mountains of Madness.

"One by One" was featured in the soundtrack of the 8th installment in the Tony Hawk's video game series, Tony Hawk's Project 8, which released in 2006.

Track listing

Bonus DVD
Recorded with a handy cam by Achim Köhler, May 2, 2003 during the Metal Gods Tour, live at B.B. King's in New York.
 "Wrath from Above"
 "Damned in Black"
 "One by One"
 "Tyrants (Part 1)"
 "Tyrants (Part 2)"
 "Solarfall"
 "Beyond the North Waves"

Critical reception

AllMusic called it "arguably one of the best black metal releases ever put forth" and a "masterpiece".

Personnel
Abbath Doom Occulta – vocals, guitars, bass (tracks 2-8)
Horgh – drums
Iscariah – bass (track 1)

Charts

References

External links
 Official website*
 Immortal Discography
 Encyclopaedia Metallum

Immortal (band) albums
2002 albums
Nuclear Blast albums
Albums produced by Peter Tägtgren